Rollinia dolichopetala is a species of plant in the Annonaceae family. It is endemic to Ecuador.  Its natural habitats are subtropical or tropical moist lowland forests and subtropical or tropical moist montane forests. It is threatened by habitat loss.

References

dolichopetala
Endemic flora of Ecuador
Near threatened flora of South America
Taxonomy articles created by Polbot
Taxobox binomials not recognized by IUCN